Charles Packer (29 November 1877 – 25 October 1958) was a Barbadian cricketer. He played in thirteen first-class matches for Barbados and Trinidad and Tobago from 1896 to 1902.

References

External links
 

1877 births
1958 deaths
Barbadian cricketers
Barbados cricketers
Trinidad and Tobago cricketers
People from Saint George, Barbados